The Fly Market or Fly Market was an outdoor market located at the base of Maiden Lane, off the East River in Manhattan, New York City. The market ran from 1699 until the early 1800s, selling meat, country produce and fish under its covered roofs.

History
The land on which the market was held was originally a salt marsh with a brook. By the early 1800s the "Fly Market" was the city's principal market. By the late 18th century till its demise, The Fly Market was New York's oldest market.

Fly Market Slip 
Fly Market Slip extended into the East River, beginning at the end of the road now known as Maiden Lane, between Pearl and South Streets. The slip was earlier known as Maiden Slip and Countess Slip; however, when the public Fly Market was built there in 1706, the name changed as well. The original slip was filled to South Street about 1820 and was made part of Maiden Lane in 1824. After the slip was filled in, the new space between the piers retained the Fly Market Slip name.

Etymology of Fly Market name 
The word "Fly" in Fly Market does not refer to insects. It comes from the Dutch vly, meaning a valley or low-lying area.

References

External links 

Fly Market painting - 1870s - by William P. Chappel - Met Museum collection

Retail markets